Éole was a  74-gun ship of the line of the French Navy.

Between 1791 and 1793, she was based in Saint-Domingue. She took part in the Glorious First of June, where she and  dismasted .

She later took part in the Expédition d'Irlande, an ill-fated attempt to invade Ireland.

On 19 August 1806, during the Atlantic campaign of 1806, she was dismasted by a tempest off Martinique, and had to be taken in tow by American ships to Annapolis. She was eventually condemned in 1811, and broken up in 1816.

Several of her 36-pounder long guns were loaned to Fort McHenry in 1813 and used in the defence of Baltimore in September 1814.

See also
 List of ships of the line of France

References

Ships of the line of the French Navy
Téméraire-class ships of the line
1789 ships
Ships built in France